The Robert Award for Best Actress in a Supporting Television Role is one of the merit awards presented by the Danish Film Academy at the annual Robert Awards ceremony. The award has been handed out since 2013.

Honorees

2010s 
 2013: Birthe Neumann for 
 2014:  for Broen II
 2015:  for The Legacy
 2019:  for

References

External links 
  

2013 establishments in Denmark
Awards established in 2013
Actress in a Supporting Television Role
Television awards for Best Supporting Actress